Monardella robisonii is a species of flowering plant in the mint family, known by the common name Robison's monardella.

Distribution
It is endemic to California, where it is known only from sky island habitats in the Mojave Desert mountains, primarily within areas of Joshua Tree National Park and of lower elevations in Sand to Snow National Monument. It is found among granite boulders in the Desert chaparral and Pinyon-juniper woodland plant communities.

Where ranges overlap, it can intergrade with Monardella linoides or Monardella mojavensis.

Description

The inflorescence is a head of several pale pink flowers blooming in a cup of pinkish or brownish bracts. Its bloom period is June to September.

References

External links
 Calflora Database: Monardella robisonii (Robison's monardella, Rock pennyroyal)
 Jepson Manual eFlora (TJM2) treatment of Monardella robisonii
 USDA Plants Profile for Monardella robisonii
 UC Photos gallery: Monardella robisonii

robisonii
Endemic flora of California
Flora of the California desert regions
Natural history of the Mojave Desert
~
~
Flora without expected TNC conservation status